In June 2016, in the aftermath of the Battle of Fallujah (2016), as many as 643 local Sunni tribesmen from the area of Saqlawiyah were abducted by the Shiite militia Kataib Hezbollah. After being moved to remote locations, they were tortured and extrajudicially murdered.

Aftermath 
Dead bodies of at least 300 civilians were found in the Al-Nourain school yard in the village. All of the victims were from the al-Saqlawiya tribe. According to a local activist, 605 people who were detained during the fighting had on Sunday been taken to the al-Mazraa army base, east of Fallujah. A video alleging to feature released detainees showed a number of men receiving treatment for injuries to their heads and upper bodies.

References

2016 murders in Iraq
Massacres in Iraq
War crimes in Iraq
Massacres in 2016
Anti-Sunni attacks and incidents